Mount Putnam may refer to:

 Mount Putnam (Idaho)
 Mount Putnam (Vermont)